The 2001–02 Scottish First Division was won by Partick Thistle who were promoted to the Scottish Premier League. Raith Rovers were relegated to the Second Division however Falkirk avoided being relegated because Airdrieonians became insolvent.

Table

Attendances

The average attendances for Scottish First Division clubs for season 2001/02 are shown below:

Scottish First Division seasons
1
2
Scot